Goran Jerković (born 23 April 1965 in Derventa, SFR Yugoslavia) is a retired Bosnian Croat Association football midfielder. He played for NK Osijek in the Yugoslav First League, and few lower-league German clubs.

References

1965 births
Living people
People from Derventa
Association football midfielders
Yugoslav footballers
Croatian footballers
NK Osijek players
1. FC Schweinfurt 05 players
Eisenhüttenstädter FC Stahl players
FC Augsburg players
TSV Schwaben Augsburg players
Yugoslav First League players
2. Bundesliga players
Yugoslav expatriate footballers
Expatriate footballers in Germany
Yugoslav expatriate sportspeople in Germany
Croatian expatriate footballers
Croatian expatriate sportspeople in Germany